Howard Arnold Jarvis (September 22, 1903 – August 12, 1986) was an American businessman, lobbyist, and politician.  He was a tax policy activist responsible for passage of California's Proposition 13 in 1978.

Early life and education
Jarvis was born in Magna, Utah. Although he was raised as a Mormon, he smoked cigars and drank vodka as an adult.

He graduated from Utah State University. In Utah, he had some political involvement working with his father's campaigns and his own. His father was a state Supreme Court judge and, unlike Jarvis, a member of the Democratic Party. Howard Jarvis was active in the Republican Party and also ran small town newspapers.  He moved to California in the 1930s due to a suggestion by Earl Warren.  Jarvis bought his home at 515 North Crescent Heights Boulevard in Los Angeles for $8,000 in 1941.  By 1976, it was assessed at $80,000.  He married his third wife, Estelle Garcia, around 1965.

Political career
Jarvis was a Republican primary candidate for the U.S. Senate in California in 1962, but the nomination and the election went to the moderate Republican Thomas Kuchel. Subsequently, he ran several times for Mayor of Los Angeles on an anti-tax platform and gained a reputation as a harsh critic of government. He founded the Howard Jarvis Taxpayers Association in 1978.

The HJTA pushed for the passage of California Proposition 13 in 1978. The proposition adjusted the property tax rate, pegging it at 1% of the purchase price of the property. This proposal was popular, largely due to the high inflation and associated rises in property taxes through the 1970s. Jarvis and his wife collected tens of thousands of signatures to enable Prop. 13 to appear on a statewide ballot, for which he garnered national attention. The ballot measure passed with nearly two-thirds of the vote. Two years later, voters in Massachusetts enacted a similar measure.

In the campaign, Jarvis argued that lowering property tax rates would cause landlords to pass savings onto renters, who were upset at their rapidly rising rents driven by the high inflation of the 1970's. Most landlords did not do this, which became a motivating factor for rent control.

Awards
In 1979, Jarvis received the S. Roger Horchow Award for Greatest Public Service by a Private Citizen, an award given out annually by Jefferson Awards.

Film appearance
In 1980, he had a cameo appearance in the film Airplane!, playing an incredibly patient taxicab passenger. His character spends the entire movie sitting in an empty cab waiting for the driver (played by Robert Hays) to return, with the meter running all the while. Jarvis has the final line in the movie, which he says after the end credits; he looks at his watch and says "Well, I'll give him another twenty minutes, but that's it!" The inside joke was that Jarvis would never have paid for such a charge in real life.

Death
Jarvis died in 1986 in Los Angeles at the age of 83, of complications of a blood disease.

Bibliography

Additional sources

References

External links

Howard Jarvis at Find-A-Grave

When Jarvis Stormed the Capitol
Jarvis group evolves into a money machine Contra Costa Times March 10, 2010.
Howard Jarvis Collection, 1970-1986. Guide California State Library, California History Room.

1903 births
1986 deaths
Former Latter Day Saints
Activists from California
California Republicans
People from Orange County, California
People from Magna, Utah
Burials at Forest Lawn Memorial Park (Hollywood Hills)
Conservatism in the United States